Marilyn! The New Musical, (also known as just Marilyn!)   is a musical with a book by Tegan Summer, music by Gregoy Nabours, and lyrics by them both. It is based on the life of Marilyn Monroe, and utlizes people and events from the golden age of Hollywood. 

Produced by Prospect House Entertainment, in collaboration with Caesars Entertainment, and Authentic Brands Group the brand management company that over sees Marilyn Monroe's estate. With direction by Summers and choreography by Ferly Prado, the original production of Marilyn! premiered in Las Vegas at the Paris Theater in June 2018, after early preview tryouts at Glendale's Alex Theatre for a one-night-only presentation. Its original stars included Kelley Jakle, from the Pitch Perfect franchise as Marilyn Monroe.

Synopsis
Michelle is a young journalist from England researching Marilyn Monroe to commemorate the actress' 90th birthday. She visits Charlie Page, one of Marilyn's drivers, who is now living a life of solitude. Two stories emerge as Charlie bonds with Michelle he recalls Marilyn Monroe's phenomenal life in flashback and reveals the real reason behind his living as a recluse for over forty years.

Cast

Musical numbers
Note: As the Playbill does not designate which act the musical numbers are featured in, the songs are simply listed here.
 "Norma Jean" – Charlie, Gladys, Grace, Norma Jean, Jimmy, Ensemble
 "This Could Be It!" - Norma Jean, Bill, Marilyn, Ensemble
 "My Heart Belongs to Daddy" - Marilyn, Ensemble
 "I Just Wanna Drive!" - Marilyn, Charlie, Ensemble
 "The Picture's Bigger Than The Girl" - Marilyn, Darryl Zanuck, Ensemble
 "Villa Nova" - Joe DiMaggio, Marilyn, Ensemble
 "The Time of My Life (I Deserve More)" - Marilyn
 "I Ain't Stoppin'!" - Ella Fitzgerald, Ensemble
 "You Belong to Me" - Marilyn, Darryl Zanuck, Ensemble
 "Someone Else Ago" - Marilyn, Bill
 "The Battle of the Blondes" - Marilyn, Jayne Mansfield, Ensemble
 "Don't Wanna Be Me" - Marilyn, Norma Jean
 "The Showgirl In The Spotlight (My, My, Marilyn)" - Marilyn, Milton Greene
 "We're Cemented" - Marilyn, Jane Russell
 "Happy Birthday, Mr. President" - Marilyn
 "I'm Not Saying Goodbye" - Company
 "Diamonds Are a Girl's Best Friend" - Company

Productions

Glendale, California
The brain-child of Tegan Summer, CEO of Prospect House Entertainment, Marilyn!, was produced by Prospect House in association with Glendale Arts Productions and premiered at the Alex Theatre in Glendale California.

Las Vegas
In 2017, a condensed version of the show, which ran about 90-minutes, was put on for prospective investors at The Space in Las Vegas.

In April 2018, it was announced that Tegan Summer would be bringing Marilyn! The New Musical to Las Vegas, with a projected opening date of May 23, at the Paris Theater. It was revealed actress Ruby Lewis would be starring as the titular character. The show opened to mixed reviews, and after less than a month, it was revealed the show would close on June 29, 2018, with plans to reopen September 4. This hiatus was to give producers time to rework the show, but Marilyn never reopened.

Response

Critical reception
After it's one-night-only performance at the Alex Theatre in Glendale, California, audience reaction was generally positive. Following the sold out event, and positive reactions, Prospect House Entertainment announced encore performances in Beverly Hills, Las Vegas, Beijing, and Shanghai.

The Las Vegas production opened on June 1, 2018, to mixed reviews from theatre critics. However, Lewis received widespread acclaim for her performances as Marilyn. The Las Vegas Sun gave the Paris Theater production of Marilyn! very positive reviews, with Brock Radke saying, "...the grand opening performance... was a rapid-fire affair, bouncing from song to song with roller-coaster momentum and an extraordinary amount of emotion from a gifted cast anchored by Ruby Lewis as Marilyn." Conversely, Mike Weatherford from Nevada NPR called the show, "...half-baked," going on to say, "this mediocre musical doesn’t even give casual fans the screen Marilyn: The sex appeal balanced by a sweetness and vulnerability that made men want to protect as well as possess."

Also see
 Bombshell
Marilyn! the Musical
Marilyn: An American Fable

External Links
Archived Las Vegas Website

References

2016 musicals
American musicals
Biographical musicals
Biographical plays about actors
Cultural depictions of Joe DiMaggio
Cultural depictions of Marilyn Monroe
Plays set in the 1960s
Works about Marilyn Monroe